Heavy Heavy is the fourth studio album by the Scottish indie group Young Fathers. It was released on Ninja Tune on 3 February 2023.

Release
On 12 July 2022, the band released the single "Geronimo", their first new music in four years. The album was officially announced on 20 October 2022, alongside a second single "I Saw" and a music video directed by Austrian-Nigerian artist David Uzochukwu. A third single, "Tell Somebody", was released on 6 December 2022 with another Uzochukwu-directed music video. "Rice", the fourth and final single, was released on 9 January 2023, also with a Uzochukwu-directed visual.

Critical reception

Heavy Heavy was met with critical acclaim. At Metacritic, which assigns a normalized rating out of 100 to reviews from professional publications, the album received an average score of 87, based on 16 reviews.

Anthony Boire of Exclaim! gave the album an 8 out 10 rating, writing, "Heavy Heavy may be a little too sweet for long-time listeners, but its massive choruses, strong hooks and ecstatic sound too timely and too powerful to deny." Loud and Quiet Mag gave the album 9/10, calling it "a brilliant return from a gold-standard band in UK music". The Scotsman gave the album 4/5, writing Heavy Heavy "is delivered with mic-drop confidence, encased in another striking sleeve, redolent of partying with claws out".

Reviewing the album for AllMusic, Andy Kellman noted that, "Heavy Heavy pulls in the listener with an empathetic lust for life that, whether brimming with optimism, steeling for a threat to survival, or reckoning with a perceived futility of existence, somehow never wavers." For DIY Magazine, Sean Kerwick described it as, " Unique, raw and totally joyous." In the review for NME, Dhruva Balram declared that, "Heavy Heavy is a passionate, soulful and often mesmerising work that will stick around long past the first listen. Succinct and underpinned by a catchy melodic structure, it continues Young Fathers’ peerless run of singular albums and further cements them as one of the more unique acts to exist today."

Writing for Pitchfork, Will Pritchard stated that, "Heavy Heavy sweeps its listener along, churchlike, and conveys the feeling that resisting the urge will always feel worse than rising up and pushing the air from your lungs. And then, after a brief 10 tracks, it's all over—as if the procession has marched on, out of earshot. But the invite is still there extended: It's up to you whether to accept it or not."

Track listing

Charts

References

2023 albums
Ninja Tune albums
Young Fathers albums